Caughall is a former civil parish, now in the parish of Backford, in the Borough of Cheshire West and Chester and ceremonial county of Cheshire in England. In 2001 it had a population of 29. The parish included Caughall Manor and Chester Zoo. The civil parish was abolished in 2015 and merged into Backford.

See also

Listed buildings in Caughall

References

External links

Former civil parishes in Cheshire
Cheshire West and Chester